Jean-Girard Lacuée, count of Cessac (château de Lamassas), near Hautefage-la-Tour in the arrondissement of Agen, 4 November 1752 - Paris, 18 June 1841) was a French general and politician, peer of France and Minister for War under Napoleon I of France. His name is inscribed on the south side (column 18) of the Arc de Triomphe.

Life
Lacuée  was born near Agen in 1752. He became a member of the Institute, minister of state in 1807, and minister of the administration of war in 1810. He died in 1841.

Notes

References

External links
  Académie française
  Archives nationales (CARAN) – Service Historique de l’Armée de Terre – Fort de Vincennes – Dossier S.H.A.T. Côte : 7 Yd 396.
  Côte S.H.A.T., état de services, distinctions sur web.genealogie.free.fr : Les militaires.

1752 births
1841 deaths
People of the First French Empire
French commanders of the Napoleonic Wars
Members of the Académie Française
French Ministers of Defence
French military writers
Peers of France
French male writers
State ministers of France